The following lists events that happened during 2015 in the Kingdom of Lesotho.

Incumbents
King: Letsie III
Prime Minister: Tom Thabane (until March 30), Pakalitha Mosisili (starting March 30)

Events

February
 February 2 - A shootout between the Lesotho Defence Force and two former bodyguards of Prime Minister Tom Thabane, leaves one bystander killed and three wounded.
 February 28 - Early general elections will be held following mediation in the aftermath of the 2014 political crisis.

References

 
2010s in Lesotho
Lesotho
Lesotho
Years of the 21st century in Lesotho